Fridolf Rhudin (10 October 1895 – 6 March 1935) was a Swedish actor and comedian.

Filmography 
 Simon of Backabo (1934)
 Secret Svensson (1933)
 Fridolf in the Lion's Den (1933)
 Jolly Musicians (1932)
Pojkarna på Storholmen (1932)
 Ship Ahoy! (1931)
 The False Millionaire (1931)
 Cavaliers of the Crown (1930)
Finurliga Fridolf (1929)
 Artificial Svensson (1929)
 Black Rudolf (1928)
Den Sorglustige barberaren (1927)
 The Ghost Baron (1927)
 The Rivals (1926)
Mordbrännerskan (1926)
 First Mate Karlsson's Sweethearts (1925)
För hemmet och flickan (1925)
Flickan från paradiset (1924)
 The People of Simlang Valley (1924)
Närkingarna (1923)
Fröken på Björneborg (1922)
Körkarlen (1921)
Värmlänningarna (1921)
Carolina Rediviva (1920)
Erotikon (1920)
Mästerman (1920)

Swedish male film actors
Swedish male silent film actors
20th-century Swedish male actors
Swedish comedians
1895 births
1935 deaths
People from Munkfors Municipality
20th-century Swedish comedians